"Forever" is a power ballad by the American rock band Kiss. It was released as the second single from the 1989 album Hot in the Shade.

Background
The song was co-written by Paul Stanley and Michael Bolton.

"Forever" begins with Stanley singing over an acoustic guitar intro, with the rest of the band joining during the first chorus.

The song was remixed at Electric Lady Recording Studios in New York, by Michael Barbiero and Steve Thompson for commercial release as a single. A music video was released to promote the song. It received heavy airplay on MTV, attaining the #1 position on the channel's "Most Requested Videos" show several times. The clip is perhaps the most understated video Kiss has released, as it shows the band playing the song in an empty room.

"Forever" peaked at number 8 on the Billboard Hot 100 chart on April 21, 1990, making it the group's first US Top 40 single since "I Was Made for Lovin' You" reached number 11 in 1979. It was the band's ninth and, to date, last Top 40 American single. It also reached number 17 on Billboard's Hot Mainstream Rock Tracks on March 17, 1990.

Personnel
 Paul Stanley – lead vocals, acoustic guitar
 Bruce Kulick – electric guitar, bass, acoustic guitar solo, backing vocals 
 Eric Carr – drums, percussion, backing vocals
 Phil Ashley – keyboards

Charts

Weekly charts

Year-end charts

References

1980s ballads
1989 songs
1990 singles
Kiss (band) songs
Geffen Records singles
Songs written by Michael Bolton
Songs written by Paul Stanley
Hard rock ballads